The Hi-Lo League is a high school athletic conference that is affiliated with the CIF Central Section (CIF-CS). Members are small schools in the remote desert regions of eastern California. The league and its schools joined the CIF-CS in 2017; previously, they were part of the CIF Southern Section. The Hi-Lo League sponsors 8-man football.

Members
 Big Pine High School
 Baker Valley High School
 Immanuel Christian School
 Lee Vining High School
 Lone Pine High School
 Owens Valley High School
 Mojave High School (California)
 Trona High School

References

CIF Central Section